Les Arcs–Draguignan is a railway station in Les Arcs and near the town Draguignan, Var department, southeastern France. It is situated on the Marseille–Ventimiglia railway. The station is served by high speed trains to Paris, Nancy and Nice, and regional trains (TER Provence-Alpes-Côte d'Azur) to Nice, Marseille and Toulon.

References

External links
 

Railway stations in Var